Triplophysa daochengensis is a species of stone loach in the genus Triplophysa. It is endemic to the Daocheng River in Sichuan Province, China. This species reaches a length of

References

daochengensis
Freshwater fish of China
Endemic fauna of China
Taxa named by Wu Yu-Yi
Taxa named by Sun Zhi-Yu
Taxa named by Guo Yan-Shu
Fish described in 2016